The 1948 UCI Road World Championships took place in Valkenburg, the Netherlands.

For the first time, six riders per country were allowed to participate in the professional race. The Cauberg had to be climbed every lap. Briek Schotte became the winner in the professional cyclists' road race after 266.8 kilometres of cycling (27 laps). Only 10 of the 50 riders who started rode out the race.

Events Summary

References

 
UCI Road World Championships by year
W
R
R